Maimuna Gombe Abubakar popularly known as (Momee Gombe), is a Nigerian Kannywood actress.

Life and career 
Momee Gombe was born on 11 July 1999, in Gombe State, Nigeria. She attended primary and secondary school in Gombe.
The actress is starring with Hausa musician and actor Adam A Zango who she mentions as her mentor in the Kannywood industry, followed by singer Hamisu Breaker, and singer and actor Garzali Miko and other young Hausa singers in Northern Nigeria.

Personal life 
Momme Gombe married popular Hausa singer Adam Fasaha in 2021, but the marriage ended in less than a month, with many speculating that it was due to her relationship with Hamisu Breaker.

Films 
She has appeared in over 30 films, of which there are:

 Kishin Mata
 Asalin Kaun
 Alaqa (series)

See also 
 List of Nigerian actors
 List of Kannywood actors

References

External links 
 Momee Gombe on Instagram
 Momee Gombe on Facebook

Living people
Hausa-language mass media
Actresses in Hausa cinema
21st-century Nigerian actresses
Nigerian Fula people
Kannywood actors
1997 births
People from Gombe State
Hausa people